The following is a list of monarchs who used the title Duke of Opole and controlled the city and the surrounding area either directly or indirectly (see also Duchy of Opole).

Piast dynasty 

 1163-1173 Bolesław I the Tall (Bolesław Wysoki), Duke of Silesia at Wrocław
 1173-1201 Jarosław Opolski, son, first Duke of Opole
 1201 Bolesław I the Tall, again
 1201-1202 Henry I the Bearded (Henryk I Brodaty), son of Bolesław, ceded Opole to his uncle
 1202-1211 Mieszko I Tanglefoot (Mieszko I Plątonogi), Duke of Racibórz
 1211-1230 Casimir I (Kazimierz I), son
 1230-1246 Mieszko II the Fat (Mieszko II Otyły), son, followed by his brother
 1246-1281 Władysław I
 1281-1313 Bolko I, son of Władysław
 1313-1356 Bolko II, son, jointly with his brother
 1313-1323 Albert
 1356-1401 Władysław II, son of Bolko II, jointly with his brothers
 1356-1370 Bolko III and
 1356-1365 Henry
 1396-1437 Bolko IV, son of Bolko III, jointly with his brother
 1396-1400 Bernard
 1437-1476 Nicholas I (Mikołaj I), son of Bolko IV, jointly with his brother
 1437-1439 Jan I 
 1476-1532 Jan II the Good (Jan II Dobry), son of Nicholas I, jointly with his brothers
 1476 Louis and
 1476 Nicholas II (Mikołaj II)

Various dynasties 

 1532-1543 possession of Brandenburg
 1543-1549 Georg Friedrich of Brandenburg Hohenzollern (Jerzy Fryderyk Brandenburski)
 1549-1551 Ferdinand of Austria (Ferdynand Austriacki)
 1551-1556 Isabelle and Sigismund Zapolya (Izabela and Zygmunt Zapolya)
 1556-1558 Georg Friedrich of Brandenburg Hohenzollern (Jerzy Fryderyk Brandenburski)
 from 1558 possession of the Habsburgs of as kings of Bohemia, sometimes governed by dukes from other dynasties

Princes of Transylvania 

 1597-1598 Sigismund Bathory (Zygmunt Batory) - Nephew of Polish king
 1622-1625 Gabriel Bethlen (Gabriel Bethlen)

House of Vasa 

 1645-1648 Wladislaus IV of Poland (Władysław IV Wasa) - King of Poland
 1648-1655 Charles Ferdinand Vasa (Karol Ferdynand Waza) 
 1655-1666 John II of Poland (Jan Kazimierz Waza) - King of Poland

House of Habsburg 

 1666-1742 possession of the House of Habsburg as kings of Bohemia

References